The 13th National Congress of the Kuomintang was the thirteenth national congress of the Kuomintang, held on 7 to 13 July 1988 in Linkou Township, Taipei County, Taiwan.

History
The congress date was recommended by Chairperson Chiang Ching-kuo to coincide with the 51st anniversary of the start of Second Sino-Japanese War.

Results
Lee Teng-hui was elected as Chairperson of the Kuomintang on 8 July 1988 from acting Chairperson of the party after the death of the former Chairperson Chiang Ching-kuo on 13 January 1988.

References

1988 conferences
1988 in Taiwan
National Congresses of the Kuomintang
Politics of Taiwan